Santhoshathil Kalavaram is a 2018 Indian Tamil-language thriller film written and directed by Kranthi Prasad, Produced by V.C. Thimma Reddy, Co- Produced by Kranthi Prasad, Monotosh Sinha, Biswatosh Sinha and Pradip Sinha under Mango Trees Films and Sree Guru Cinemas banner. The film features an ensemble cast including Niranth, Rudra Aura, Aaryan, Gouthami, Soujanya, Shivani and Apeksha in the lead roles. Sivanag composes the music for the film. The film released on 2 November 2018.

Plot 
The clash between Good and Evil. Although, the film is a thriller, it encompasses friendship, love, affection, comedy and spirituality as well. fight between negative and positive.

Cast 
Niranth as Veenu
Rudra Aura as Johny
Aaryan as Akash
Ravi Mariya as Ragupathi
Gouthami Jadav as Kalaivani
C.Kalyan as Vicky
Apeksha Panchal as Sonam
Soujanya as Harini
Shivani as Sujatha Subramanian
Jai Jagannadh as Murugan
Alex as Ramana
Swamy as Shyam

Production 
Santhoshathil Kalavaram, directed by Kranthi Prasad in her directorial debut, features technicians and artistes from seven different industries, including cinematographer Paulius Kontijevas from Hollywood. A major portion of the film happens in the forest and he wanted to capture the sounds of nature in its purest form; so he roped in English Vinglish and Dhrishyam-fame sound designer Arun Varma.

Soundtrack

References

External links 
 
 
 

2018 films
2010s Tamil-language films
Indian thriller films
2018 directorial debut films
2018 thriller films